Josh Alexander is an American songwriter and producer best known for his collaborations with songwriter/producer Billy Steinberg.  His work includes songs for Demi Lovato ("Give Your Heart a Break"), JoJo ("Too Little Too Late"), Nicole Scherzinger ("Don't Hold Your Breath") and t.A.T.u ("All About Us").

Biography
A native of San Francisco, Alexander was trained in classical piano and according to Billy Steinberg, Alexander can "play piano extremely well, like Elton John."  Steinberg met Alexander through Steinberg's uncle. Alexander was the son of friends of Steinberg's uncle, and Alexander was only 19 or 20 at the time they met. Steinberg signed him to his first publishing deal at age 20.

Alexander decided early in his career to become a "complete songwriter", writing melodies, tracks, and lyrics.

Songwriting credits

References

Year of birth missing (living people)
Living people
Writers from San Francisco
Songwriters from California
Place of birth missing (living people)
Record producers from California